Sundo is a 2009 Filipino horror-suspense film from director Topel Lee, with screenplay written by his Ouija screenwriter Aloy Adlawan. The film stars Robin Padilla, Katrina Halili, Rhian Ramos, Hero Angeles, Mark Bautista and Sunshine Dizon. The film was released on March 18, 2009.

Plot 
The film opens with Vanessa (Iza Calzado) who was killed when she was visited by her long dead husband as her companion. The film then cuts to protagonist Romano (Robin Padilla), a retired military operative who goes into seclusion after being seriously wounded in battle and almost died, discovers that he has the uncanny ability of seeing ghosts around people who will soon encounter sudden, disastrous deaths. Worried of his brother, Romano's blind sister Isabel (Rhian Ramos) persuades him to return to Manila with the help of Louella (Sunshine Dizon), Romano's childhood friend who is a doctor and harbors affection for him.

An aspiring actress, Kristina (Katrina Halili), a widow, Lumen (Glydel Mercado), and her nephew, Eric (Hero Angeles) hitch a ride with Romano, Isabel and Louella along with Louella's driver, Baste (Mark Bautista). On their van's way back to the city, the group manages to avoid a fatal accident on the road as Romano woke up just in time to warn Baste - having just dreamt of the impending tragedy. As he steps out of the van to survey the scene, he started seeing ghosts surrounding the van and eventually looking at him. The ghosts are an old man, a young woman with hair covering her face, two more adult men, and a woman who Romano thinks look like his mother. He also hears a baby crying though he is unable to see it. After this, the group stopped to eat dinner and rest in a small eatery in Baguio. Just as Lumen mentioned that she needs to use the ladies room, one of the adult male ghosts showed himself to Romano and interacted with him. Soon after, Lumen died as a rail spike pins her head. The next tragic event happened as Eric died of electrocution while attending Lumen's husband's wake, right after the other adult male ghost grabbed Romano to get his attention.

The group now consulted with a local elder who informs them that Romano can see ghosts because of an open third eye. Moreover, the ghosts that he sees are "Sundo" - or those who the grim reaper uses to fetch a person who is about to die. The Sundo can be anyone such as a spouse, siblings, parents, or a friend - anyone who has previously died and has a close relationship with the person. Because Romano prevented the earlier road accident from happening when they are "meant" to die, they still "owe" the grim reaper their lives and this debt will be collected no matter what. After leaving the local elder, the group discussed that there are 7 people in the van but Romano only saw 5 ghosts. Romano is unsure whether the ghost of their mom is his or his sister Isabel's Sundo.

Baste and Kristina also died right after their Sundo show themselves to Romano. Baste's Sundo is the old man who turned out to be his grandfather who raised him. Kristina's Sundo is the young woman with hair covering her face who is a twin sister that she is not aware exists. After these deaths, Romano, Isabel and Louella decided to stay in Louella's apartment and spend the night.

Louella, feeling emotional and scared, finally confessed to Romano that the remaining mysterious ghost - a crying baby - is her Sundo. She got pregnant while in medical school, felt that she was not ready to be a mother and had an abortion.

Later on, Romano was lured to the balcony by Isabel as his Sundo. As he realizes that his sister is already dead, the grim reaper pushed him over the balcony. Romano lands into the pool and regains consciousness. As he ascends from the pool he saw a distraught Louella crying. She tells him that he can't be her Sundo, as she already repaid the grim reaper with a life - that is Isabel's life and not her own. She insists that she cheated death by doing so and he can't fetch her. Romano realizes that Louella killed his sister and a flashback of Louella smothering a sleeping Isabel with a pillow is shown. Louella continued to plead to Romano and look visibly scared. Romano then looked at the pool and saw his dead floating body. It turned out that he has died in the water and is now Louella's Sundo. The end scene show the grim reaper going for a screaming Louella as she dies.

Cast 
 Robin Padilla as Romano
 Sunshine Dizon as Louella
 Rhian Ramos as Isabel
 Katrina Halili as Kristina
 Hero Angeles as Eric
 Mark Bautista as Baste Glydel Mercado as Lumen
 Jacklyn Jose as Mercedes
 Iza Calzado as Vanessa

 Reception 
The film opened with favorable reviews, obtaining a B''' grade from the Cinema Evaluation Board, and a PG-13 rating from the MTRCB (Movie and Television Review and Classification Board) - the country's film rating system. Critic Nitz Miralles described the film as "a high octane horror", she continuous to praise director Topel Lee for his ability to genuinely scare the audience, as like from his previous horror film efforts like Ouija and Yaya. However, the film is criticized for being "too violent" for a PG-13 movie by critic Veronica R. Samio, whilst praising the film for its fast pace and screenwriter Aloy Adlawan's "shocking" twist ending.

The final gross of the movie is P100,079,566 according to box office mojo.

Media Release
The series was released onto DVD-format and VCD-format by GMA Records. The DVD contained the full-length trailer of the movie. The DVD/VCD was released in 2009.

Deaths
 Vanessa (droppin phone and suicide)
 Mercedes (mirror illusion and fell off the stairs)
 Lumen (wapping the ball and sword)
 Eric (wapping floor and the electric fan burn)
 Kristina (shower and burn face)
 Baste (burning the eyes and truck accident)
 Isabel (suffocated by Louella)
 Romano (blacking shadow monsters and killed monsters)
 Louella (getting into the monsters)

See also 
List of ghost films
GMA Films
Ouija (2007 film)

References

External links 
 
 

GMA Pictures films
2009 horror films
2009 films
Philippine ghost films
Philippine horror films
Philippine haunted house films